Boroumand, Boromand, Burumand or Borumand is an Iranian or Persian surname that may refer to:
Adib Boroumand (1924–2017), Iranian poet, politician, and lawyer
Habib Boromand Dashghapu (born 1961), Iranian shiite cleric and politician
Manouchehr Boroumand (1934–2017), Iranian weightlifter
Marzieh Boroumand (born 1951), Iranian actress, puppeteer, screenwriter and TV film director
Masoud Boroumand (1928–2011), Iranian football forward
Parviz Boroumand (born 1972), Iranian football goalkeeper
Taraneh Boroumand, Iranian playwright, writer, poet, and translator

See also
Mahmudabad-e Borumand, a village in Iran

Persian-language surnames